Drosophila erecta is a West African species of fruit fly, and was one of 12 fruit fly genomes sequenced for a large comparative study.

References

External links 
 Drosophila erecta at FlyBase
 Drosophila erecta at Ensembl Genomes Metazoa
 

e